The 1958 anti-Tamil pogrom and riots in Ceylon, also known as the 58 riots, refer to the first island-wide ethnic riots and pogrom to target the minority Tamils in the Dominion of Ceylon after it became an independent dominion from Britain in 1948. The riots lasted from 22 May until 29 May 1958 although sporadic disturbances happened even after the declaration of emergency on 27 May 1958. The estimates of the murders range, based on recovered body count, from 158 to 1,500. Although most of the victims were Tamils, Sinhalese and their property were also affected by retaliatory attacks by Tamil mobs throughout the Batticaloa and Jaffna districts. As the first full-scale race riot in the country in over forty years, the events of 1958 shattered the trust the communities had in one another and led to further polarisation.

Background

In 1956, Solomon Bandaranaike came to power in Ceylon, on a majority Sinhala nationalist platform.  The new government passed the Sinhala Only Act, making Sinhala the sole official language of the country.  This was done despite the fact that nearly a quarter of the population used Tamil as their primary language. The Act immediately triggered discontent among the Tamils, who perceived their language, culture, and economic position as being subject to an increasing threat.

In protest, Tamil Federal Party politicians launched a satyagraha (Nonviolent resistance) campaign. This led to an environment of increased communal tensions and to the death of over 150 Tamils in the Gal Oya riots in the east of the country. Eventually Bandaranaike entered into negotiations with them and the Federal party and agreed to the Bandaranaike-Chelvanayakam Pact of 1957, which would have made Tamil the administrative language in the Tamil-speaking north and east regions. But he was forced to cancel the pact under pressure from Sinhala nationalists and some Buddhist monks, particularly the United National Party, which organised a 'March on Kandy', led by JR Jayawardene.

The Sinhala Only policy led to motor vehicles bearing the Sinhala sri character on their license plates. In response, the Federal Party initiated the anti-Sri campaign which involved smearing tar upon the sri characters. This led to a wave of reprisal tarrings of Tamil offices, shops, houses, and even people in the south by Sinhalese gangs as part of a pro-Sri campaign. The anti-Sri campaign also became popular among Indian Tamil youths in the hill country. In Bogawantalawa on April 2, Indian Tamil campaigners had stoned a bus. The bus driver took the bus to the police station, and the rioters followed. They continued their assault on the bus, and some attacked the police station. The police opened fire, killing two men. The now enraged crowd started attacking Sinhalese property and people. The violence had led to Sinhalese reprisals. The pro-Sri campaign began in Kahawatte on April 3. At that town on the same day, two Sinhalese men were stabbed and killed by two Tamil traders, and Tamil boutiques were burnt in revenge. The next day, a Sinhalese man was stoned to death by an Indian Tamil mob in the Hatton area. Bandaranaike requested Savumiamoorthy Thondaman, leader for the Ceylon Workers' Congress, to calm down the rioters. Thondaman went to the area and did so successfully. Around the same time, 300 Sinhalese laborers of the Land Development and Irrigation Department armed themselves with blades and proceeded to the Tamil village Cheddikulam in trucks. Before they could reach Cheddikulam, an armed group of four Tamils had fired at the gang, and the gang retreated.

Meanwhile, 400 Tamil labourers were laid off when the British Royal Navy closed its base in Trincomalee.  The government proposed to resettle them in the Polonnaruwa district.  This angered the Sinhalese population there. Sinhalese labourers began forming gangs and threatening vigilante attacks on any Tamil migrants to the region. 

On 14th of April, a Sinhalese man was murdered by a Tamil in Trincomalee for communal reasons. This led to tension and a few incidents at Trincomalee, but no prolonged trouble or violence. Soon after, Buddhist organizations began calling for the boycotting of Tamils in Sinhalese areas. 

In Welimada, the electorate of the ultranationalist K. M. P. Rajaratne, a rally on April 24 resulted in several attacks on Tamil boutiques. Additionally, in Sinhalese areas, racist pamphlets were sent to government posts and members of the public threatening violence against non-Sinhalese Buddhists if they did not go to the North and East.

On May 15, a Sinhalese trader had been shot dead in Chenkaladi and another Sinhalese was severely wounded by stabbing. This occurred after a hand bomb was thrown at the house of a Tamil man, but it is not known if the killing was related to this. Regardless, the deceased was returned to his hometown Matara where tensions arose.

Pogrom

Buildup of violence

May 21

C. Rajadurai, a minister for Batticaloa, received information that preparations were being undertaken by Sinhalese conspirators to attack the Tamils travelling by train through Polonnaruwa to the Federal Party convention in Vavuniya (due to be held on the 23rd, 24th and 25th of May). He alerted the Assistant Superintendent of Police of Batticaloa by letter. The leading conspirators were later confirmed by C. P. de Silva to have been spreading false rumours about the Tamils, and to have also been involved in the previous 1956 anti-Tamil pogrom.

May 22

Further information on the preparations being made to attack the Tamils had become apparent to the Federal Party leadership. A large armed crowd of Sinhala labourers (around 500) from the Land Development and Irrigation departments had gathered at Polonnaruwa ready to attack the Tamils. The Police did nothing to stop them and just looked on.

A small incident occurred in Valaichchenai, but as the story reached Polonnaruwa, the story was twisted into a more serious event having occurred. To retaliate, Sinhala hardliners decided to disrupt party members travelling to the convention by rail. Polonnaruwa station was the first to be attacked, on 22 May. Most passengers of the train had gotten off earlier due to the threat of violence in Polonnaruwa. One man was found in the train, and the mobs beat him despite his insistence that he was not a Tamil. Another man, Mr. Gnanamuttu, a Tamil notary public was also beaten up.

May 23
A night mail train in Batticaloa was derailed. Its passengers, mostly Sinhalese, were attacked. Three people — Victor Fernando, Police Sergeant Appuhamy, and Constable Pararajasingham — were killed. Tarzie Vittachi suggests that the derailing was committed by Sinhalese wreckers who made a serious miscalculation, as the passengers were mainly Sinhala and not Tamil. S. J. V. Chelvanayakam argued that it was unlikely that any person with abiding interests in the Batticaloa area would have carried out the derailment, and said that one possible motive for it was to derail a train expected to carry Tamil delegates to the Federal Party convention. However, this is disputed by historian James Manor who suggests that the perpetrators were more likely to be Tamils retaliating for the earlier attack in Polonnaruwa given that the derailment took place in a Tamil-majority area where anti-Sinhalese violence was rising.

May 24

Deadly violence in the Polonnaruwa District began on the 24th. Tamils were killed in the open, as well as Sinhalese who protected them. A deaf, mute labourer of unknown ethnicity was also killed. A Sinhala 'Hamudawa' (army) composed of Sinhala labourers from various state departments and farms went on the rampage raping, looting and beating up hundreds of Tamils. Sinhalese who were believed to be hiding Tamils "had their brains strewn about". Polonnaruwa had only a small police presence. Requests for reinforcements were not heeded as the Government seemed reluctant to take the situation in the North Central Province seriously. The thugs displayed a temerity which was quite unprecedented. They had complete assurance that the police would never dare to open fire. The Polonnaruwa station was attacked again on 24 May, and nearly destroyed.

By the evening, there was a well-established pattern of Tamil violence against Sinhalese in Eravur. That night, D. A. Seneviratne, former mayor of Nuwara Eliya, was shot in his car at Eravur while he was on his way to his estate in Kalkudah, though this was alleged by Tamil politicians to have due to personal reasons rather than racial ones.

May 25
In the morning, a truck and car were fired at near Eravur, the latter incident killing an off-duty Sinhalese police officer and two other Sinhalese.

News of the murder of D. A. Seneviratne spread through the Uva Province, inflaming tension there. There were indications that there would be retaliatory violence against Tamils.

Sinhalese gangs attacked Tamil labourers in Polonnaruwa farms at night. The Tamil labourers in the Polonnaruwa sugar-cane plantation fled when they saw the enemy approaching and hid in the sugar-cane bushes. The Sinhalese mobs however set the sugar cane alight and flushed out the Tamils. As they came out screaming, men, women and children were cut down with home-made swords, grass-cutting knives and katties (a type of cutter), or pulped under heavy clubs. Those who fled were clubbed down or hit by machetes.  In Hingurakgoda, rioters ripped open the belly of an eight-month-pregnant woman, and left her to bleed to death. One woman in sheer terror embraced her two children and jumped into a well. Vittachi estimates that 70 people died the night of 25 May, though Manor claims that this is an exaggeration.

May 26
Tamil refugees in Polonnaruwa were being guarded at the police station. Throughout the day, Sinhalese mobs from various parts of the Polonnaruwa area converged at the station for a nighttime assault. There was only a small police force to keep the crowd at bay. At around 2 p.m., an army unit of 25 men arrived with a Bren gun to aid the police officers. Fearing that the unit's arrival was a sign of more army units on the way, the 3,000 strong mob decided to attack the station before more security arrived. At around 3:20 pm, the mob started to advance onto the police station. The army fired warning shots, but this only made the mob more confident that the army was bluffing. Polonnaruwa District Government Agent Derryck Aluwihare signed an order permitting the security forces to shoot people if necessary. With this, the soldiers fired a Bren gun at the advancing crowd, killing three. The crowd dispersed thereafter.

Violence against Tamils also took place in areas like Kurunegala, Dambulla, Galewela, and Panadura. At 10 a.m. that morning, following the spread of news of the deaths of Police Sergeant Appuhamy and D. A. Seneviratne, Sinhalese gangs began beating Tamils in Colombo and several of its suburbs. Shops were burned and looted. At this stage, the violence was largely limited to assault, looting, and arson. That evening, Prime Minister Bandaranaike made an appeal to the nation calling for peace. However, he implied that Tamils had initiated the riots by only mentioning the killings in the Batticaloa District, particularly D. A. Seneviratne's murder, as a cause of communal violence.

Countrywide violence

Violence against Tamils

Bandaranaike's appeal ended up triggering far more severe anti-Tamil violence. What had been limited to mostly limited to arson, looting, and assault now included murder and rape. Widespread rioting along the coast from Colombo to Matara was mainly triggered by the return of Sinhalese fishermen who had been chased to the ocean by Tamil rioters in the Eastern Province. 

The body of D. A. Seneviratne passed through Badulla on the 26th, which attracted mourners, some of whom were I.R.C.'s. That night, after the police van left, Tamils in the town were attacked and their boutiques were set on fire. Violence soon spread through the Badulla District. The next day, many Land Development Department laborers came to Badulla town from Kandeketiya. The Government Agent of the Badulla District, accompanied by Badulla MP J. C. T. Kotelawala, appealed to them to leave. After touring the town, they left. On the 28th evening, the laborers, inflamed by false rumors, forcibly stored a large number weapons in the Muthiyangana Buddhist temple. The military cracked down on the temple the next day and confiscated the weapons before the laborers could wreak havoc.

In Panadura, a rumor spread that Tamils had cut off the breasts and murdered a female teacher in Batticaloa.  Upon hearing this rumour, a Sinhalese gang tried to burn down the Hindu Kovil; unable to set fire to the building, they pulled out a Brahmin priest and burned him alive instead. Subsequent investigations showed there was no female teacher from Panadura stationed in Batticaloa. Gangs roamed Colombo, looking for people who might be Tamil.  The usual way to distinguish Tamils from Sinhalese was to look for men who wore shirts outside of their pants, or men with pierced ears, both common customs among Tamils.  People who could not read a Sinhala newspaper (which included some Sinhalese who were educated in English) were beaten or killed.

One trick used by the gangs was to disguise themselves as policemen.  They would tell Tamils to flee to the police station for their safety.  Once the Tamils had left, the empty houses were looted and burned. Across the country, arson, rape, pillage and murder spread. Though the state police eventually helped to quell the riots, they were accused of being initially inactive and even fanning the riots in several places. Some Sinhalese did try to protect their Tamil neighbours, often risking their own lives to shelter them in their homes. 

Sinhalese laborers of the Land Development and Irrigation Department from Padaviya formed a mob armed with firearms, hand bombs, knives, and other weapons. They also had trucks to transport them. Though they planned on going to Anuradhapura, they took an indirect route on the Padaviya—Kebitigollewa—Vavuniya Road to outmaneuver the army, attacking whatever Tamils they could find on the way. The army and police intercepted the rioters south of Kebitigollewa. They killed 11 rioters, and arrested 343. Some of the prisoners later confessed that they would have gone further south to Matale and Kandy had they not been stopped.

Violence against Sinhalese
After the Polonnaruwa incidents of 23 and 24 May, Tamil rioters in Eravur retaliated against isolated Sinhalese homes and trades people. In Eravur, fishermen from the two communities fought on the seashore. Tamil gangs set up roadblocks, beating up motorists believed to be Sinhalese. A Sinhalese man and his wife were set on fire and their belongings were looted. The violence intensified after news of the murders of the Panadura priest and Tamil fiscal clerk in Kalutara circulated. Throughout the Batticaloa District, Sinhalese were mercilessly killed by Tamil rioters. In Valaichchenai, Muslims sheltered Sinhalese who fled from Tamil mobs. 56 cases of arson and attacks were registered in the Batticaloa District, and 11 murders were recorded, but it is believed that the actual number of Sinhalese killed in Karativu alone is far larger than the official statistic. Many Sinhalese had managed to flee by water and land on the southern coast, but others had fled into the jungle, where they had succumbed to hunger and wild animals. The houses and huts of Sinhalese that had already fled were looted and then burned.

Jaffna turned violent on May 28 with the arrival of the news of the murder of the Panadura priest. No deaths were reported, but some Sinhalese merchants had their inventories burned. Tamil mobs would order Sinhalese out of their properties, loot valuables, and then burn the properties. The behavior of the mobs led politicians in Colombo to suspect that the violence was organized. A mob attacked the Buddhist Naga Vihare temple, which was rebuilt afterwards. The mob tried to kill a Buddhist monk there, but he was saved by the police. Two days later, a mob from Kayts moved onto the Nagadipa Vihare temple at Nainativu and destroyed it.

Government response
Police and army presence was heightened in the Eastern Province and North Central Province following the violence in the early stages of the riots. On 26 May, when the violence began spreading across the island, the army and police suppressed incidents of violence. However, there were many cases of police being inactive due to the anti-police culture fostered by the government in the last two years. Once island-wide violence erupted, on 27 May, a state of emergency was declared. Governor General Sir O. E. Goonetilleke gave the security forces permission to shoot rioters if necessary. The army proceeded to sternly suppress rioters, killing them if necessary. The Federal Party and Jatika Vimukti Peramuna were both banned.  Most of the country's senior Tamil politicians were Federal Party members and were later arrested. Within two days, the military had restored order in Colombo and eventually the rest of the country. Nearly 12,000 Tamil refugees had fled to camps near Colombo.  The government secretly commissioned six European ships to resettle most of them in Jaffna in early June. The army was eventually withdrawn from civilian areas in the rest of the country, but remained present in Jaffna for 25 years.

On 3 September 1958 the Tamil Language (Special Provisions) Act – which provided for the use of the Tamil language as a medium of instruction, as a medium of examination for admission to the Public Service, for use in state correspondence and for administrative purposes in the Northern and Eastern Provinces – was passed, substantially fulfilling the part of the Bandaranaike-Chelvanayakam Pact dealing with the language issue.

Legacy

As the first full-scale race riot in Ceylon in over forty years, the events of 1958 shattered the trust the communities had in one another. Both major ethnic groups blamed the other for the crisis, and became convinced that any further compromises would be interpreted as a sign of weakness and be exploited. A partial cleansing of Tamils from Sinhalese-majority areas and Sinhalese from Tamil-majority areas occurred.  Thus, the path to the Sri Lankan Civil War was clear. Velupillai Prabhakaran, a small boy at the time of the riots, said later that his political views as an adult were shaped by the events of 1958:

For him and many other Tamils, the burning to death of the Panadura Hindu priest greatly affected their thinking:

The famous book "Emergency '58" records the events of this pogrom. The book also explores into the manifestation of Sinhalese nationalism in the form of anti-Tamil movement in a large-scale pogrom as a result of closely coordinated action of politicians, Buddhist monks, and rural Sinhalese.

See also
 List of riots in Sri Lanka
 Black July
 Sri Lankan Civil War

Notes

References

External links
 Biography of Tarzie Vittachi, author of book on the riots

Anti-Tamil pogrom
Anti-Tamil pogrom
History of Sri Lanka (1948–present)
Sri Lankan Tamil politics
Ethnic riots
Riots and civil disorder in Sri Lanka
Massacres in Sri Lanka
Origins of the Sri Lankan Civil War
Anti-Tamil pogrom
Anti-Tamil pogrom
Anti-Tamil pogrom